The Church of the Holy Trinity or simply Trinity Church is a Roman Catholic Parish church located in Marsa, Malta.

History
The foundation stone of Trinity church was laid on Sunday, October 20, 1909. The building of the church was entirely financed by benefactors Lorenzo Balbi and his wife Carmela née Ozzini, a wealthy childless couple from Valletta. The church was built on designs by Giovanni Domenico Debono with the master builder, Michele Mifsud. 

The construction of the church took 2 years and 9 months to be completed. The total cost amounted to an estimated cost of £7000. On April 19, 1913 the church was officially opened and declared a parish. The church was blessed by the General Vicar of the Diocese of Malta, Monsignor Luigi Attard, and the deputy of the Archbishop of Malta, Pietro Pace. The parish church was entrusted to the care of the Capuchin Friars.

References

Marsa, Malta
Limestone churches in Malta
Roman Catholic churches completed in 1913
20th-century Roman Catholic church buildings in Malta